Entlerville is an unincorporated community in Upper Frankford Township, Cumberland County, Pennsylvania,  United States.

The ZIP code in Entlerville is 17241, identified by the U.S. Postal Service as Newville, but that is also shared by several neighboring communities, including Bloserville, Cobblerville, Dickinson Township, Doubling Gap, Greenspring, Hays Grove, Heberlig, Little Wash(ington), Lower Mifflin Township, McCrea, North Newton Township, Upper Frankford Township, and Upper Mifflin Township. Entlerville appears on the US Geological Survey Map entitled Landisburg, at latitude 40.263 and longitude -77.346. US Census data indicated that as of 2007, there were 39 business entities in Entlerville; 29 of those with between one and four employees, seven businesses with 5-10 employees, one with between 10 and nineteen employees, and two that employed between twenty and forty people.

References

Unincorporated communities in Cumberland County, Pennsylvania
Unincorporated communities in Pennsylvania